Nebojša Jovović (Cyrillic: Небојша Јововић, born 28 August 1974) is Montenegrin football manager and former player who played as a striker.

Playing career
Born in Titograd, after starting at youth team of local FK Crvena Stijena, Jovović signed with FK Budućnost Podgorica in 1988. He played 10 years in total at Budućnost. In 1998, he had a spell abroad at Turkish side Kayserispor, after which he returned and played three more seasons in the First League of FR Yugoslavia with Sartid Smederevo.

In 2001, he played with FC Slavia Mozyr in Belarus, in 2002 he played with Swedish side Assyriska FF and Montenegrin FK Zeta, 2003 with Chinese Henan Jianye, and, finally, in 2004 with Polish Zagłębie Lubin.

Coaching career
On 23 March 2017, Nebojsa was appointed head coach of Al-Faisaly Amman.

On 28 August 2017, he was named as Egyptian Professional League side Al-Zamalek.

On 1 January 2018, Nebojsa get back as head coach of Al-Faisaly Amman.

On 13 August 2018, Nebojsa became the head coach of Al-Shorta.

On 15 July 2019, Nebojsa became the head coach of CS Sfaxien.

On 1 December 2019, Nebojsa became the head coach of Al Ahli SC (Doha).

Managerial statistics

Honours as manager

Al-Faisaly (Amman)
Jordan League: 2016–17
Jordan FA Cup: 2016–17
Jordan Super Cup: 2017
Arab Club Championship: Runner-up 2017

Al-Shorta (Baghdad)
Iraqi Premier League: 2018–19

CS Sfaxien
Tunisian Cup: 2018–19

References

External links
 Nebojsa Jovovic at Official Nebojsa Jovovic Website
 
 Nebojsa Jovovic at Vijesti portal

1974 births
Living people
Footballers from Podgorica
Association football forwards
Serbia and Montenegro footballers
FK Budućnost Podgorica players
Kayserispor footballers
FK Smederevo players
FC Slavia Mozyr players
Assyriska FF players
FK Zeta players
Henan Songshan Longmen F.C. players
Zagłębie Lubin players
First League of Serbia and Montenegro players
Serbia and Montenegro expatriate footballers
Expatriate footballers in Turkey
Serbia and Montenegro expatriate sportspeople in Turkey
Expatriate footballers in Belarus
Expatriate footballers in Sweden
Serbia and Montenegro expatriate sportspeople in Sweden
Expatriate footballers in China
Serbia and Montenegro expatriate sportspeople in China
Expatriate footballers in Poland
Serbia and Montenegro expatriate sportspeople in Poland
Montenegrin football managers
FK Kom managers
Hajer Club managers
FK Sutjeska Nikšić managers
Al-Faisaly SC managers
Zamalek SC managers
Al-Shorta SC managers
CS Sfaxien managers
Al Ahli SC (Doha) managers
Montenegrin expatriate football managers
Expatriate football managers in Saudi Arabia
Montenegrin expatriate sportspeople in Saudi Arabia
Expatriate football managers in Jordan
Expatriate football managers in Egypt
Montenegrin expatriate sportspeople in Egypt
Expatriate football managers in Iraq
Expatriate football managers in Tunisia
Expatriate football managers in Qatar
Montenegrin expatriate sportspeople in Qatar